Djønno is a small village on the Oksen Peninsula in the municipality of Ullensvang in Norway's Hardanger district, in Vestland county.

Geography
The nearest neighboring village is Kaland, which lies  further into the fjord. Djønno is known for its fruit orchards.

The village first received a road connection in 1981, when it was connected by Norwegian County Road 302 to the northeast. Before that, passengers and cargo were transported to and from the village by boat. Now people from Djønno can travel much more easily to the neighboring municipalities of Granvin and Ulvik than to Kinsarvik, the administrative center of their own municipality. Today, young people from Djønno attend school in Granvin.

Name
The name of the village is also used as a surname, spelled Djønne.

Notable people
Notable people that were born or lived in Djønno include:
Rannveig Djønne (born 1974), folk musician
Jorunn Hanto-Haugse, orchardist and illustrator

References

Ullensvang
Villages in Vestland